Nitra (also known by other alternative names) is a city in western Slovakia, situated at the foot of Zobor Mountain in the valley of the river Nitra. It is located 95 km east of Bratislava. With a population of about 78,353, it is the fifth largest city in Slovakia. Nitra is also one of the oldest cities in Slovakia; it was the political center of the Principality of Nitra. Today, it is a seat of a kraj (Nitra Region), and an okres (Nitra District).

Etymology
The first mention of Nitra dates back to the 9th century. The name of the city is derived from the Nitra river. The name is Indo-European, but the question of its pre-Slavic or Slavic origin has not been satisfactorily answered. Nitra might be derived from the old Indo-European root neit-, nit- meaning "to cut" or "to burn" using a derivation element -r- (see also slash-and-burn  agricultural technique). The same root is still present in the Slovak verb nietiť (to make a fire), but also in other Indo-European languages like Latin nitere (to burn) or in German schneiden (to cut). Another view to the origin of the name is related to the Latin Novi-iter or Neui-iter meaning "new territory behind the limes". The hypothetical Latin name could be adopted by the Quadi and later by the Slavs.

The first written records contain also suffix -ava (Nitrava). Particularly in older literature, the suffix is interpreted as deriving from the Proto-Germanic root *ahwa (water). However, the suffix -ava can be found also in numerous toponyms with a clearly Slavic origin and without any relationship to rivers. Although, the existence of hydronym Nitrava remains hypothetical and all versions with the suffix are related to a location, not a river. Thus, the form Nitrava can refer to a larger property or territory around the river Nitra. Both forms were probably used concurrently and were recorded already in the 9th century  (Conversio Bagoariorum et Carantanorum: "in loco vocata
Nitraua", but in 880 "ecclesie Nitrensis").

History

Before the 5th century
The oldest archaeological findings in Nitra are dated to around 25,000-30,000 years ago. The locality has been inhabited in all historical periods in the last 5,000-7,000 years. Several European archaeological cultures and groups were named after important archaeological discoveries in Nitra or near surroundings - Nitra culture, Brodzany-Nitra group or Lužianky group of Lengyel culture.

The people of Madarovce culture had built the first fortification on Castle Hill by around 1,600 BCE. In the Iron Age, a large hillfort  was built on Zobor Hill and additional smaller hillforts on the Lupka Hill and in Dražovce (700-500 BCE). Several Celtic settlements are known from the 5th-1st centuries. The Celts minted silver tetradrachms known as coins of Nitra type and probably also built a hillfort in the locality Na Vŕšku. In the Roman period (1st-4th centuries CE), the Germanic tribe of Quadi settled in the area, which is also mentioned as their possible capital (396 CE). The largest Germanic settlement from the migration period in Slovakia was unearthed in Nitra-Párovské Háje.

5th to 10th centuries
The first Slavs arrived to Slovakia at the end of the 5th and early 6th century. The early Slavs settled mainly in the lowlands near the water flows, the highest density of their settlements is documented just in the area of Nitra. As the Avars expanded to the territory of Slovakia in the later half of the 7th century and early 8th century, the border between Slavic and Slavo-Avaric territory moved toward Nitra. A biritual cemetery in Nitra-Dolné Krškany lay on the northern border of mixed settlement area.

The importance of Nitra for the Slavs began to grow in the 8th century and thereafter it evolved to administrative centre of the wider region. Nitra became the center of the Principality of Nitra. Three of the eleven extant copies of the Conversio Bagoariorum et Carantanorum contains a reference to a church consecrated for Pribina in his domain called Nitrava. The problem of Pribina's church and the dating of this event was addressed by numerous scholars, most of them have no doubt about reliability of information and associates this event with Nitra. In 833, Pribina was ousted by the Moravian prince Mojmír I and both regions were united into the early medieval empire of Great Moravia.

In the 9th century, Nitra was one of the largest agglomeration in Central Europe. The agglomeration consisted of fortified centres and more than twenty non-fortified villages. It spread out on a territory exceeding the present town. The Slavs, Slovak ancestors, built a large castle (8.5 hectares) on Castle Hill, further important locations Na vŕšku and Martinský Vrch were probably also fortified. Other hills, some of them fortified already in prehistoric times, had guarding and refuge function. Surrounding villages were used as an agricultural hinterland for princely retinue and for specialised production (jewellery production, forges, pottery kilns, etc.). More than forty burial sites are documented on 20 km2. In all burial sites, exclusively inhumation rite (compliant with Christian belief) was practised, instead of cremation typical for earlier Slavs. The known necropolises with military equipment around the perimeter of the agglomeration probably belonged to the settlements guarding access roads to the centre.

The city reached its height during the reign of Svätopluk I. During his rule, the first known Christian bishopric in Slovakia was established in Nitra in 880 (with Wiching as the bishop). The question of origin of Monastery of  St. Hippolytus (the oldest Benedictine Monastery in Kingdom of Hungary) has not been sufficiently answered yet. Even if findings of ceramics documented a settlement in the location, its character is unclear.

10th to 13th centuries
The development of Nitra was temporarily slowed down after the disintegration of Great Moravia. However, Nitra did not follow the fate of other prominent Great Moravian centres (Mikulčice-Valy, Pohansko, Staré Město-Uherské Hradište), and until the 13th century it preserved its status as a prestigious centre. According to older assumptions, Nitra should have been occupied by masses of Magyar (Hungarian) units, predictably followed by significant destruction of the previous settlements. However, later archaeological research does not support this theory. The extinction horizon (e.g. destruction by fire) is not documented for any known settlement, and the continuity between the graveyards from different periods remained high. In the 10th century, the settlement structure was not affected by any observable destruction process or significant change in the ethnic composition. The continuity of Slavic settlements and economic infrastructure was preserved. Archaeological evidence pointing to an early presence of Magyars directly in Nitra has not been found yet, except of the warrior grave in Nitra-Mlynárce Paradoxically, their presence is documented north of Nitra (Čakajovce) and from peripheral areas with more rural character, where they joined the majority Slavic population. Here, their members were buried together with the Slavs in common graveyards. Later, both cultures merged into the common Bijelo Brdo culture, with ethnic-specific attributes fading away.

Political affiliation of the territory in the 10th and the early 11th century is unclearthe influence of Hungarian Árpáds, Czech Přemyslids and Polish Piasts is being considered. Finally, Nitra became an integral part of the Kingdom of Hungary and the seat of several Árpáds princes. The town survived the invasion of Mongols in 1241. In 1248, Béla IV gave Nitra the privileges of a free royal town. In 1271–1272, Nitra was heavily damaged by the Czech king Ottakar II. The raids also damaged the bishop's property and therefore, as compensation, Nitra was put under his administration in 1288. The town lost its royal privileges and in the next centuries it was unable to recover mainly because of frequent military conflicts.

14th to 19th centuries
In the early 14th century, the town and the castle were damaged several times by Matthew III Csák. In the conflict between the king and oligarchy the bishop of Nitra remained loyal to the king. In 1313, the king confirmed bishopric privileges and extended them for the right to administer not only Nitra, but whole Nitra County.

The town became a target of Hussite attacks in the 15th century, at the time defended by Ispán of Nitra county, Stibor of Stiboricz and later his son Stibor de Beckov. After the Hungarian defeat at the Battle of Mohács in 1526 and subsequent Ottoman advances into the Hungarian territory, Nitra was under threat of Ottoman attacks.  In 1563, the town became the seat of the Captaincy of Lower Hungary. The Turkish forces failed to capture the castle three times, before they conquered it in 1663. Habsburg troops under Jean-Louis Raduit de Souches recaptured it on 2 May 1664 prior to the Battle of Léva. The Turks returned at the start of the Great Turkish War and held the town until 1685. The town was also affected by anti-Habsburg uprisings, from Stephen Bocskay and Gabriel Bethlen uprisings in the 17th century to the Kuruc uprisings from 1703 to 1711, and the town burned down in 1708 as a result of fights. It was renovated in the 18th century in the Baroque style. As a consequence of the Revolutions of 1848, Nitra was awarded an independent self-government for the first time since 1288 and became independent from the Diocese of Nitra and its bishops. Still an agricultural and handicraft town, Nitra started to industrialize. Until World War I, distillery, agricultural machines factory, brewery, dairy and other works were established. The first indirect connection to a railway was a road built in 1850 to the closest station in Trnovec nad Váhom. The railway arrived to Nitra in 1876, when a connection from Šurany was built. Later, lines were built to Topoľčany, Hlohovec and Nové Zámky. As a part of Magyarization, from 1883 to 1919, Nitra was the seat of the Upper Hungarian Teaching Association (FEMKE), a government-sponsored association whose main goal was to apply Magyarization policies on Slovaks.

20th to 21st centuries

After World War I and in the atmosphere  of postwar chaos and raising anarchy, the Hungarian National Council in Nitra decided to negotiate with the Czechoslovak Army, pushing out Hungarian military forces and police from the territory of present Slovakia. The Hungarian National Council and the Town Council needed the Czechoslovak Army to restore public order, but hoped that situation was only temporary and formally protested against the "occupation" on 10 December 1918. However, the town became a part of Czechoslovakia. Nitra continued to be the seat of the Nitra county, until it was dissolved in 1928. In 1933, Nitra played an important role in the Slovak autonomist movement when the Pribina's Celebration (the anniversary of the consecration of the first Christian church) turned to the largest demonstration against Czechoslovakism.

After the break-up of Czechoslovakia in 1939, Nitra became a part of the First Slovak Republic and once again a seat of Nitra county until 1945. The period of the First Slovak Republic was tragic for the numerous Jewish population of Nitra, which was first victimized by the anti-Jewish law and then mostly exterminated in German concentration camps (90% of Jewish citizens). The city was liberated by the Soviet Red Army in 1945, for only three years of restored democracy in Czechoslovakia.

Slovak historians believe that Nitra is the location of the oldest Slovakian Jewish community.

The Communist period from 1948 to 1989 was marked by the oppression of the Catholic church, which has traditionally had a strong presence in Nitra. Catholic seminaries, monasteries and other properties were nationalized and converted to museums, schools and offices. This period experienced extensive growth, building of housing projects and annexing of formerly independent villages. After the Velvet Revolution of 1989 and dissolution of Czechoslovakia, Nitra became part of newly established Slovakia and became a seat of the Nitra Region in 1996.

In 2008, the remains of Jozef Tiso—the controversial leader of the First Slovak Republic who collaborated with the Nazis and was executed in 1947 as a war criminal—were exhumed from a Bratislava cemetery and reburied in the canonical crypt of the Catholic Cathedral in Nitra.

Geography

Topography
It is located in the Nitra River valley in the Danubian Lowland, where the bigger part of the city is located. A smaller part is located at the southernmost reaches of the Tribeč mountains, more precisely at the foothill of the Zobor mountain . Other towns in the surroundings include Trnava to the west (53 km), Topoľčany to the north (35 km), Levice to the east (42 km), and Nové Zámky (37 km) and Komárno (71 km) to the south. A national natural reservation called Zoborská lesostep is located within the city's boundaries.

Climate
Nitra lies in the humid continental climate with four distinct seasons. It is characterized by a significant variation between hot summers and cold, snowy winters. The city is located in the warmest and driest part of Slovakia.

Main sights

Points of interest in the area include the Nitra Castle, the old town and the adjacent hill, named Zobor, overlooking the city.

Notable religious structures located in Nitra are St. Emmeram's Cathedral in Nitra castle, a Piarist church of St. Ladislaus and the adjacent monastery.
The oldest church of the city is the Saint Stephen church, which was built in the 11th-12th century, although the foundation of the building was constructed in the 9th century.

The monastery on Piaristicka street was founded in the 13th-14th century. Its dominant church of St. Ladislaus was later destroyed by a fire and remodelled in 1742–1748 in baroque style. Two towers were also added. The main altar has a statue ornamentation which the portraits of Saint Stephen and Ladislaus I of Hungary. The interior was renovated in 1940 and three modern frescos depicting themes from Slovak history of Nitra were created. 

The old town (Staré Mesto) is dominated by the castle (Hrad), which is one of the most interesting ancient structures in Slovakia. Archeological finding indicate that a large fortified castle had already stood here at the time of Samo's Empire, in the seventh century. Archaeological findings prove the existence of a church from the ninth century beneath the more recent Gothic St. Emmeram's Cathedral. The construction of the stone castle began during the 9th century during the reign of the Prince of Nitra Svätopluk. The castle currently serves as the seat of one of Roman Catholic bishoprics in Slovakia, which was founded in 880 as the first bishopric of western and eastern Slavs, which continued its existence since then, with the break from the 10th century until around 1110.

The Dražovce church is a remarkable example of the early Romanesque architecture.

The Nitra Synagogue was built in 1908-1911 for the Neolog Jewish community. It was designed by Lipót (Leopold) Baumhorn (1860–1932), the prolific Budapest-based synagogue architect. Located in a narrow lane, the building is an example of Baumhorn's style. A mélange of Moorish, Byzantine and Art Nouveau elements, it faces the street with a two-tower façade. The sanctuary is a domed hall supported by four pillars that also support the women's gallery. After more than a decade of restoration by the municipality of Nitra, the building is now used as a center for cultural activities. The women's gallery houses "The Fate of Slovak Jews" – Slovakia's national Holocaust memorial exhibition. The Nitra Synagogue serves as a permanent exhibition space for graphic works by the Nitra-born Israeli artist Shraga Weil.

The most powerful medium wave transmitter of Slovakia, running on 1098 kHz , was situated in Nitra at Velke Kostolany until recently. This transmitter could broadcast throughout all of Europe at night. Since 2003, however, it has operated on lower output to save energy cost, and has transmitted regional programming only. 

The Virgin Mary's mission house at the Calvary hill was built in 1765 for Spanish order of Nazarens. They were taking care of the church and pilgrims. Later, the building served as an orphanage. In 1878-85 this building was rebuilt in the Novoromanesque style and in 1925 one new floor was added to the building. The building as we know it today is a work of Slovak architect M. M. Harminec. Nowadays the whole building is mission house of The Divine Word Society. The Mission museum of nations and cultures is located in this building.

Demography

Current
According to the 2011 census, Nitra has a population of 78,916. 89.3% (70,447) citizens declared Slovak nationality, 1.8% (1,443) Hungarian, 0.7% (521) Romani, 0.7% (520) Czech and 7.8% (5,330) did not specify any nationality.

Historical
The demographics changed dramatically during the 20th century; in 1910, from total population of 16,419: 9,754 (59.4%) were Hungarians, 4,929 (30.0%) Slovaks and 1,636 (9.96%) Germans - Jews are hidden under these nationalities. (According to the Slovak Jewish Heritage Center the Jews made up a quarter of the total population and the vast majority of them spoke Hungarian and were for census purposes not counted as a separate ethnicity in order to inflate the number of Hungarians.) In 1940, Nitra was home to 4,358 Jews.

Religion
The religious make-up was 66.1% Roman Catholics and 2.6% Augsburg Confession. Other denominations were declared as less than 0.5% (per denomination).

Economy
GDP per capita in 2008 for the whole Nitra region was €10,508, which was below Slovakia's average (€12,395).
Nitra's enterprises were brewery, grain mill, food processing plants and other food-related industries. In the new free trade economy after 1989, and after entering European Union and Euro currency club only the wine bottling plant is left. Out of the factories started under the communist regime 1948–1989,  the plastic processing plant is still doing well. The most prevalent industries are electronics and car parts, concentrated in the new business park.
The city plans to have in 2011 a balanced budget of 42 mil€. .

The flight operator Aero Slovakia has its head office on the grounds of Nitra Airport.

Government
The city is governed by mayor and the city council (Slovak: mestské zastupiteľstvo). The mayor is the head of the city and its chief executive. The term of office is four years. The current mayor is Marek Hattas. The city council is the legislative body, with 31 council members.

The city is divided into 13 urban districts (boroughs): Dolné Krškany, Horné Krškany, Staré Mesto, Čermáň, Klokočina, Diely, Párovské Háje, Kynek, Mlynárce, Zobor, Dražovce, Chrenová and Janíkovce.

Education
Nitra is the seat of two universities: University of Constantinus the Philosopher, with 13,684 students, including 446 doctoral students. and of the Slovak University of Agriculture, with 10,297 students, including 430 doctoral students. The city's system of primary education consists of 14 public schools and three religious primary schools, enrolling in overall 6,945 pupils. Secondary education is represented by five gymnasia with 3,349 students, 8 specialized high schools with 3,641 students, and 5 vocational schools with 3,054 students. Schools in the city include the United Catholic School.

Nitra used to be the site of the Jewish school Yeshiva of Nitra, the last surviving yeshiva in occupied Europe during World War II, associated with famous rabbis Chaim Michael Dov Weissmandl and Shmuel Dovid Ungar. The yeshiva was moved to Mount Kisco, New York, USA, after the second world war, where it still exists.

Transportation
Nitra is connected to Bratislava, Trnava, Žiar nad Hronom, Zvolen and Banská Bystrica by a freeway (E58). There are also first-class road connections to Topoľčany, Zlaté Moravce (labelled as "Highway of Death"), Vráble and Nové Zámky.

The Nitra railway station forms part of the railway line between Nové Zámky/Šurany and Prievidza, which passes through Nitra, but is not a main line. There is a railway junction a short distance north of the town, connecting the city with Leopoldov, Topoľčany and Radošina. Nitra has one train connection with Prague via Piešťany, Trenčín, Uherský Brod, Olomouc and Pardubice. This connection is operated by Arriva (AEx).

Nitra also has its own recreational airfield; it hosts the factory of the Aeropro Eurofox ultralight. However, the closest international airport is Bratislava Airport.

Local public transport is based on buses with 28 lines, covering the whole city, as well as extending to the neighbouring municipalities of Lužianky, Nitrianske Hrnčiarovce, Štitáre, Ivanka pri Nitre and Branč (as of April 2016).

Culture

Nitra is home to several museums and galleries. The Museum of the Nitra Region supervises collection objects on several fields (Archaeology, Ethnography, Numismatics, Geology and Zoology). Since 1993, it has also an exhibition of the most precisious artifacts discovered by the Archeological Institute in Nitra. The exhibition contains more than 2,200 gold, silver and other objects, among them golden-plated plaques from (pre-)Great Moravian hillfort Bojná. The Diocesan Museum of the Nitra Diocese on the Nitra Castle exhibits the facsimile of documents and archaeological discoveries closely connected to the origin of Christianity in Slovakia, including the oldest manuscript from the territory of Slovakia (the Nitra Gospel Book, 1083). Open-air museum "Osada Lupka" is a reconstruction of Slavic village from early Middle Ages. The Slovak Agricultural Museum specializes on the history of agriculture and is the only one of its kind in Slovakia. The museum has also open-air exposition (skanzen). The Mission Museum of Nations and Cultures exhibits objects from missionary activities. The Museum of Jewish Culture in the synagogue presents culture and history and has a permanent exposition dedicated to the Holocaust.

There are two theaters in Nitra: the Andrej Bagar Theatre (Divadlo Andreja Bagara) and the Old Theatre of Karol Spišák (Staré Divadlo Karola Spišáka) (Karol Spišák Old Theatre). The Nitra Amphitheater is one of the largest in Slovakia.

Nitra's main arts museum is the Nitra Gallery. Another popular gallery is The Foyer Gallery, a part of the Old Theatre of Karol Spišák. A permanent exhibition of prestigious Jewish painter Shraga Weil is installed in the Exhibition Hall of the Nitra Synagogue.

Nitra is the home town of popular Slovak music bands Gladiátor, Horkýže Slíže, Desmod, Zoči Voči and Borra.

Sport

The city's football team is FC Nitra, founded in 1909.

Nitra hosted the final tournament of the 2019 rink bandy league.

Famous people

 Svatopluk I (830–894), Prince of Nitra, King of Great Moravia
 Pribina (?–861), Prince of the Nitra and Balaton principalities
 Svatopluk II (?–906), Prince of Nitra
 Koceľ (c.833–c.876), Prince of the Balaton Principality
 Saint Bystrík (?–1046), Bishop of Nitra
 Béla I of Hungary (1016–1063), duke of Nitra, king of Hungary
 Stibor of Stiboricz (1348–1414) – Ispán of Nitra
 János Bottyán (1643–1709), Hungarian kuruc general
 Tamás Esze (1666–1708) Hungarian kuruc leader died here in 1708
 Imre Erdősi (1814–1890), Hungarian piarist monk and teacher
 Vilmos Fraknói (1843–1924), Hungarian historian
 Béla Bangha (1880–1940), Hungarian politician was born here
 Oszkar Grosz (1896–1968), Shipowner in England
 Juraj Kolník (1980–), professional ice hockey player
 Anton Lehmden (1929–2018), painter, draughtsman, and printmaker
 Branislav Mezei (1980–), professional ice hockey player
 Ľubomír Moravčík (1965–), football player
 Zita Pleštinská,  maiden name Kányaiová (1961-), member of the European Parliament
 Ottokár Prohászka (1858–1927), Hungarian Roman Catholic theologian and Bishop of Székesfehérvár
 Shmuel Dovid Ungar (1886–1945) the rabbi of Nitra and dean of the Nitra Yeshiva
 Chaim Michael Dov Weissmandl (1903–1957) a rabbi who became known for his efforts to save the Jews of Slovakia during the Holocaust
 Ernest Horniak (*1907 – † 1979), SDB,  Roman Catholic priest end religious prisoner (sentenced to 12 years in prison).
 Pavol Hrušovský (1952–) Deputy Speaker of the National Council of the Slovak Republic
 Štefan Ružička (1985–), professional ice hockey player
 Miroslav Stoch (1989–), professional football (soccer player), currently signed with Fenerbahçe S.K.                          
 Jozef Stümpel (1972–), professional ice hockey player
 Boris Valabik (1986–), professional ice hockey player
 Július Strnisko (1958–2008), Olympic Wrestler.

Twin towns — sister cities

Nitra is twinned with:

 Bački Petrovac, Serbia
 České Budějovice, Czech Republic
 Gosford, Australia
 Gyeongju, South Korea
 Kroměříž, Czech Republic
 Naperville, United States
 Osijek, Croatia
 Spišská Nová Ves, Slovakia
 Veszprém, Hungary
 Zielona Góra, Poland
 Zoetermeer, Netherlands

Gallery

References

Notes

Bibliography

 Charles R. Bowlus, "Nitra: when did it become a part of the Moravian realm? Evidence in the Frankish sources," Early Medieval Europe, 17,3 (2009), 311–328.

External links
 Nitra.sk – Official Website

 
Cities and towns in Slovakia
Great Moravia